Andrew or Andy Williams may refer to:

Arts and entertainment
Andy Williams (1927–2012), American singer
Andy Williams (album), eponymous 1958 compilation album
Andrew Williams (novelist) (born 1962), British novelist
Andy Williams (Doves) (born 1970), English musician, member of the band Doves
Andy Williams (drummer) (born 1970), British musician, Casting Crowns member
Andy Williams (guitarist) (born 1977), American guitarist and professional wrestler
Andy Williams, (fl. 1990s), British musician, member of the dance band K-Klass
Andy Williams (The X Factor) (fl. 2007), contestant in series 4 of The X Factor UK
Andy Williams (visual effects), visual effects supervisor

Politics and law
Andrew Williams (congressman) (1828–1907), U.S. Representative from New York
Andrew Williams (New Zealand politician) (born 1959), New Zealand politician, mayor of North Shore City
Andrew Williams, American politician, candidate in the United States House of Representatives elections in Illinois, 2010

Sports

Association football (soccer)
Andy Williams (footballer, born 1962), English footballer
Andy Williams (Jamaican footballer) (born September 1977), Canadian-born Jamaican football (soccer) player
Andy Williams (Welsh footballer) (born October 1977), Wales international footballer
Andy Williams (footballer, born 1986), English footballer for Cheltenham Town

Other sports
String Bean Williams (Andrew Williams, 1873–1929), American baseball player
Andrew Williams (Shropshire cricketer) (born 1965), Welsh cricketer
Andrew Williams (Cumberland cricketer) (born 1970), English cricketer
Andrew Williams (Australian footballer) (born 1979), Australian rules footballer
Andrew Williams (American football) (born 1979), American NFL football player for the San Francisco 49ers
Andy Williams (rugby union) (born 1981), Welsh international rugby union player
Andy Williams (American football) (fl. 1990s), American football coach for Washburn University in Topeka, Kansas

Others
Andy Williams (surgeon) (born 1964), British surgeon
Andrew Williams (bishop), British-born American Anglican bishop
Andy Williams (born 1986), American perpetrator of the Santana High School shooting
Andrew B. Williams, American academic in the field of engineering